Zivar (also romanized as Zīvar) is a girl name common in Iran and East Europe.
The meaning of the name "Zivar" is an ornament of gems, gold, or silver or in general jewelry.

 Zivar Mammadova, Azeri sculptor
 Zivar bay Ahmadbayov, Azerbaijani architect

See also 
 Zivar, Zanjan, village in Iran
 Sar Qaleh Zivar, village in Susan-e Gharbi Rural District, Susan District, Izeh County, Khuzestan Province, Iran

References 

Iranian feminine given names